Neville Page is a British-American film and television creature and concept designer. Born in England, he was raised in Manchester, and Chicago, Illinois. He was inspired by science fiction, including Star Wars, and makeup artist Rick Baker's work in An American Werewolf in London. Page moved to Hollywood at the age of 17, and gained roles as an actor. He graduated with honors in 1990 from the Art Center College of Design with a degree in industrial design, and went on to teach students in Switzerland. He focused his work on design consulting along with business partner Scott Robertson.

Page has worked as a concept designer on films, including Super 8, Watchmen, Star Trek, Tron: Legacy, Cloverfield, and Avatar. In 2010 his works were featured in an exhibit titled "From Page to Screen: Character and Creature Design of Neville Page" at the Oceanside Museum of Art. He joined the panel of judges on the SyFy television series Face Off for its third season alongside Ve Neill and Glenn Hetrick, replacing Patrick Tatopoulos. His works were again featured at the Oceanside Museum of Art in 2012 in an exhibit titled "The Beauty in the Beast: Crafting Creatures by Neville Page", which highlighted his designs in films, including Green Lantern, Prometheus, and Tron: Legacy.

Early life
Neville was born in England, and grew up in Manchester, England. He was later raised in Chicago, Illinois. He grew up around artistic influences; his parents worked as performers in the circus. From an early age he was motivated to pursue a career in science fiction due to his appreciation for Star Wars. Page was inspired by makeup artist Rick Baker and his film work, including An American Werewolf in London.

At the age of 17, Page moved to Hollywood to further employment in acting. He gained minor roles on soap operas, including General Hospital. He took coursework at the Art Center College of Design, and in 1989 for a class on product-design he created a machine apparatus similar to that used by the character portrayed by Sigourney Weaver in the film Aliens. He received his degree in industrial design from that institution with honors in 1990. Following his graduation, Page instructed students at the Switzerland location of the Art Center College of Design. Along with his studio partner Scott Robertson, he began work in the field of design consulting.

Career

Neville instructs students at the Gnomon School of Visual Effects in Hollywood, in addition to the Art Center College of Design, in Pasadena, California.

He has worked as a concept designer on films, including Watchmen, Star Trek, TRON: Legacy, Cloverfield, and Avatar. Cloverfield director Matt Reeves noted they hired Page to design the "creature" that appears in the film, commenting, "We would go into his office and he would have what I affectionately referred to as his 'Wall of Terror.' On the wall were all sorts of bits of color, and as you got closer suddenly your interest turned to revulsion because those pictures were like pictures of intestines and eyeballs and pieces of animals. What he was doing was having a biological, evolutionary basis for every aspect of the creature."

From July through August 2010, the Oceanside Museum of Art held an exhibition on Page. Titled: "From Page to Screen: Character and Creature Design of Neville Page", featuring works by Page, including pencil drawings, three-dimensional models, and digital creations. Page said he hoped the exhibit would educate the public about a different facet to filmmaking, "The general public tends to associate films with actors versus people who conceive and design and make the films. What is on display is one small facet of what it takes to make a movie, one of the many gears involved in the mechanism, neither more important nor less ... simply as important."

Neville has served as a judge on the SyFy television series Face Off. He joined the judging panel on Face Off in season three, which launched in August 2012. His fellow judges included Ve Neill and Glenn Hetrick. Page returned for the fourth season in 2013. In October 2012, Page returned to the Oceanside Museum of Art, with an exhibition titled, "The Beauty in the Beast: Crafting Creatures by Neville Page". The exhibit which ran for ten weeks featured 45 works by Page from films, including Green Lantern, Prometheus, and TRON: Legacy. He was the creature designer for the 2013 American science fiction action film Star Trek Into Darkness.

Reception
In the 2011 book Star Wars vs. Star Trek: Could the Empire Kick the Federation's Ass? And Other Galaxy-Shaking Enigmas, author Matt Forbeck characterized Neville Page as a "creature guru". Cloverfield director Matt Reeves spoke highly of his work with Page, "... he is a genius." Reeves characterized Page's work on the "creature" in the film, "It developed in many different ways, and it came down to what Neville was doing, which was amazing."

The North County Times referred to him observing, "Page is one of the most recognizable artists in the entertainment industry for his iconic designs." Director of exhibitions and collections at the Oceanside Museum of Art, Teri Sowell, reflected of the exhibition featuring Page's work to The San Diego Union-Tribune, "These creatures are so embedded in our minds, we take them for granted. It's really handcrafted art." Film director J. J. Abrams commented on Page's work on his film Super 8, "the designer of the creature, Neville Page, did an amazing job and I think he gave us something that took a ton of iterations but he really nailed it".

Filmography

Film

Television

Awards and nominations

See also

Clover (creature)
Face Off (season 3)
Face Off (season 4)
Glenn Hetrick
List of Art Center College of Design people
Ve Neill
Pandoran biosphere
Patrick Tatopoulos

References

External links

Living people
American make-up artists
Special effects people
American costume designers
Visual effects artists
1960s births
Art Center College of Design alumni
British costume designers